Hutchinson is a northern English patronymic from the medieval personal name Hutchin, a pet form of Hugh, it may refer to:

Hutchinson Family Singers, 19th-century American singing group
Aidan Hutchinson (born 2000), American football player
Alain Hutchinson (born 1949), Belgian politician
Alex Hutchinson, jazz musician.
Allen Hutchinson (1855–1929), English sculptor
Andy Hutchinson (born 1992), English footballer
Angela Hutchinson Hammer (1870–1952), American newspaperwoman
Anne Hutchinson (1591–1642), Puritan preacher in New England
Anne-Marie Hutchinson (1957–2020), British lawyer
Arthur Stuart-Menteth Hutchinson (1880–1971), British novelist
Asa Hutchinson, Governor of Arkansas and former US Representative
Atiba Hutchinson, Canadian soccer player
Bill Hutchinson (baseball) (1859–1926), pitcher
Billy Hutchinson, Progressive Unionist Party
Bret Hutchinson (born 1964), Australian rules footballer
Buel Hutchinson (1826–1902), American lawyer and politician
Cassidy Hutchinson, executive assistant for White House chief of staff Mark Meadows
Chad Hutchinson, NFL quarterback
Charles L. Hutchinson, businessman, philanthropist, and president of the Art Institute of Chicago
Claud Mackenzie Hutchinson (1869–1941), English bacteriologist
Dennis J. Hutchinson, professor of law
Donald P. Hutchinson, American politician
Earl Ofari Hutchinson, journalist
Eberly Hutchinson (1871–1951), New York politician
Edward Hutchinson (disambiguation), several people
Elizabeth Hutchinson Jackson (1745–1781), mother of Andrew Jackson, 7th US president
Eric Hutchinson, American singer-songwriter
Foster Hutchinson (Canadian judge) (1761-1815)
Francis Hutchinson (1660–1739), Church of England official against witchcraft trials
F. W. Hutchinson (Francis William Hutchinson, 1910–1990), pioneering HVACR engineer and member of ASHRAE Hall of Fame
Fred Hutchinson (1919–1964), MLB pitcher
Fred Hutchinson (rugby player) (1867–1941), Welsh rugby union international
G. Evelyn Hutchinson (1903–1991), British zoologist and ecologist
Gregory Hutchinson (disambiguation), several people
Guy Hutchinson, Author and comedian
Henry Neville Hutchinson (1856–1927), English writer and naturalist
Ian Hutchinson, professional motorcycle road racer
James Hutchinson (VC) (1895–1972), British recipient of the Victoria Cross during World War I
James Hutchinson (musician) aka "Hutch" Hutchinson, American bassist and studio musician
James S. Hutchinson, early explorer of the Sierra Nevada, California, USA
Jeremy Hutchinson (politician), American congressman
Jeremy Hutchinson, Baron Hutchinson of Lullington, British life peer
Joey Hutchinson, English footballer
John Hutchinson (disambiguation), several people
Jonathan Hutchinson (1828–1913), English surgeon, ophthalmologist, dermatologist, venereologist and pathologist
Josephine Hutchinson (1903–1998), American actress
Leonard Hutchinson (died 1554), Master of University College, Oxford, England
Leslie Hutchinson (1900–1969), known as "Hutch", Grenada-born singer and socialite
Lucy Hutchinson (1620–1681), English biographer
Margaret Massey Hutchinson (1904–1997), English writer, teacher and naturalist
Mark Hutchinson (disambiguation), several people
Mary E. Hutchinson (1906–1970), American artist and art instructor
Mavis Hutchinson, athlete
Meg Hutchinson, singer/songwriter
Michael Hutchinson (cyclist) (born 1973), Northern Irish racing cyclist, writer and journalist
Michael Hutchinson (ice hockey) (born 1990), Canadian ice hockey goaltender
Michael Hutchinson (politician), Belizean politician
Paul Hutchinson, English footballer
Peter Orlando Hutchinson, Victorian artist
Ralph Hutchinson (1878–1935), American athlete and coach
R. C. Hutchinson (Ray Coryton Hutchinson, 1907–1975), English novelist
Sam Hutchinson (born 1989), English footballer
Steve Hutchinson (American football) (born 1977), American football player
Steven Hutchinson (born 1968), German basketball coach and former player
Thomas Hutchinson (disambiguation), several people
Tim Hutchinson, US politician
William Hutchinson (disambiguation), several people
Wondress Hutchinson (1964–2021), American musician
Woods Hutchinson (1862–1930), English American Physician and writer
Xavier Hutchinson (born 2000), American football player

See also
Hutchison (disambiguation)
Hutchins (surname)
Hely-Hutchinson
Grice-Hutchinson

Surnames
Surnames of Scottish origin
English-language surnames
Surnames of English origin
Surnames of British Isles origin
Patronymic surnames